Emma Bryony Griffiths Malin (born 7 April 1980) is an English actress and film director.

She was born in London, the daughter of David Malin and Susan Griffiths, and was brought up by her parents in west London. Her paternal grandparents are the actors Mark Eden (real name Douglas John Malin) and Joan Le Mesurier. Her first major screen role was in Adrian Lyne's remake of Lolita (1997), in which she played Annabel.

She starred in the Agatha Christie's Marple television film They Do It with Mirrors (2010) as Gina Elsworth and the Agatha Christie's Poirot television film Death on the Nile (2004) as Jacqueline de Bellefort, and appeared in the film House of Boys (2009), which also features Layke Anderson, Stephen Fry and Udo Kier.

Selected film and television roles
Film credits include:
 Mary Reilly (1996)  
 Yapian Zhanzheng (1997) as Mary Denton
 Lolita (1997) as Annabel Lee
 Gangster No. 1 (2000) as Julie
 The Hole (2001) as Daisy
 Hills Like White Elephants (2002) as the Girl
 Animal (2005) as Justine
 Spiderhole (film) (2010) as Molly

Television credits include:
 The Cazalets (2001) as Louise Cazalet
 The Forsyte Saga: To Let (2003) as Fleur
 Agatha Christie's Poirot – Death on the Nile (2004) as Jacqueline de Bellefort
 Agatha Christie's Marple – They Do It with Mirrors (2010) as Gina Elsworth
 Wallander – The Man Who Smiled (2010) as Elin Nordfeldt

References

External links

1980 births
Living people
English film actresses
English television actresses